The Bulgarian occupation of Serbia of WW1 started in Autumn 1915 following the invasion of Serbia by the combined armies of Germany, Austria-Hungary and Bulgaria. After Serbia's defeat and the retreat of its forces across Albania, the country was divided into Bulgarian and Austro-Hungarian occupation zones. 

The Bulgarian occupation zone extended from modern-day Southern and Eastern Serbia, Kosovo and North Macedonia. The civilian population was exposed to various measures of repression, including mass internment, forced labor, and a Bulgarisation policy. According to academic Paul Mojzes: "it appears that ethnic cleansing (at a minimum) and genocide (at the maximum) did take place between 1915 and 1918", what historian Alan Kramer has termed a: "dynamic of destruction".

The occupation ended in late September 1918, after the Allied offensive at Dobro Polje, spearheaded by Serbian and French forces, pierced the Bulgarian front and liberated Serbia.

Background

Bulgaria war aims
After the San Stefano Treaty in 1878, Bulgarian leaders aspired for the reconstitution of Greater Bulgaria. Thus the areas of Pomoravlje and Macedonia, became a target of Bulgarian nationalism. Due to the loss at the Second Balkan War in 1913, the Bulgarian Kingdom had to limit their territorial pretenses over the territory of Macedonia. When Serbia was trying to obtain access to the sea in Albania, the Austro-Hungarian diplomacy got more active in order to establish a border between Albania and Montenegro; during the Second Balkan War, Bulgaria renounced the annexation of Serbian Macedonia, which was definitely annexed to Serbia after the Florence Protocol in December of 1913.

The Allies had long pressed Bulgaria to join them but her price was the acquisition of Macedonia, the Allies regarded this as reasonable on ethnic grounds but the proposals had not been agreed in advance with Serbia and Greece, which were strongly opposed to ceding their territory. The Central Powers, however, were prepared to cede what Bulgaria wanted, Serb and Greek territory. Bulgaria's traditional aims lay in the Bulgarian-inhabited areas of Macedonia, Dobrudja, and European Turkey, but in 1915 it demanded territory well beyond its ethnographic borders. On 6 September 1915, the Bulgarian government joined the Central Powers after signing a secret treaty of alliance with Germany.

Invasion of Serbia 
On 6 October 1915 under the overall command of German General August von Mackensen, Austria-Hungary and Germany began the fourth invasion of Serbia since the beginning of the war. On 14 October, the Bulgarian armies moved into Serbian territory joining the ongoing invasion. Bulgaria entered the war on the side of the Central Powers, with the primary goal of briefly regaining territory gained from the Ottoman Empire in 1912–13, then lost to Serbia during the Second Balkan War. The pressure of Austro-Hungarian, Bulgarian and German armies in the north, and their massive superiority in numbers and equipment, forced the Serbs to withdraw across northern and central Albania. On 28 November 1915, Army Group Mackensen announced the end of the Serbian campaign, thereby ending the offensive.

After a six-week campaign, the Kingdom of Serbia was almost completely invaded; it was then divided between the Habsburg Empire and Bulgaria. At the beginning of 1916, regions in the west and north and part of Kosovo were ceded to Austria-Hungary. A German occupation zone was established in the area east of Velika Morava, Južna Morava in Kosovo and the Vardar valley, the Germans took control of railways, mines, forestry, and agricultural resources. As defined by the agreement of 6 September, Bulgaria gained the whole of Macedonia and Eastern and Southern Serbia, from the Danube to Kosovo in the south. The new border with Austria-Hungary ran along the  Morava river to Stalać and then between the South (Južna) and West (Zapadna) Morava rivers, the region of Skopska Crna Gora and Šar Planina mountain. Austro-Hungary took the rest of Serbia. The Bulgarians divided the territories occupied by their troops into two military general governorates.

Bulgarian hegemony

Occupation zones 
Two administrative zones supervised by a military commander were created:
 Military Inspection Area of Morava: The zone for Serbia with its command in Niš, it encompassed the territories of Eastern and Southern Serbia, (as laid down in the secret treaty between Bulgaria and Germany of 6 September 1915), which meant the Južna Morava river valley east of the Morava river, divided into six districts and the Pirot area.
 Military Inspection Area of Macedonia: The zone encompassing Macedonia, with its center in Skopje; the greater part of Kosovo – Pristina, Prizren, Gnjilane, Urosevac, Orahovac was also placed in that zone; the Bulgarians intended to include all of Kosovo and even parts of Albania occupied by their troops into that zone, in the spring of 1916, this nearly resulted in armed conflict between Bulgarian and Austrian forces.

System of occupation 
Bulgarian policy in Macedonia, and to some degree in occupied Serbia, was motivated by what historian Alan Kramer has termed a ‘dynamic of destruction’ a desire not just to defeat the enemy militarily, but also to erase all traces of its culture and destroy any evidence that it had ever been there at all. In order to create pure Bulgarian territories, the Bulgarian military government started implementing in eastern Serbia, Macedonia, and parts of Kosovo a political system of systematic denationalization, Bulgarisation, and economical exploitation. 

In the Morava zone, where the majority of the population was Serbs, transforming the region into a part of the Kingdom of Bulgaria, meant the extermination of the Serbian nation and culture and for this the removal of all representatives of Serbian national spirit; teachers, clergymen, journalists as well as members of Serbian Parliament as well as former soldiers, officers and military official between 18 and 50 years of age were interned, shot or deported to Bulgaria as prisoners of war or to work as forced labourers.

In the zone of Macedonia, Bulgaria, like Serbia, did not recognise the local Slav population as a separate ethnic or nationalistic group. Both Bulgaria and Serbia considered the Slavic-speaking population as being ethnically linked to their nation and thus asserted the right to seek their integration. The Bulgarian denationalisation policy, including its paramilitary aspect, was almost identical in its intent and execution to the Serbian policy that preceded it in the contested region between the two countries. About half of Vardar Macedonia, as the region was called by Serbia, was also inhabited by various ethnic groups who did not identify as Bulgarian; according to a 1912 survey by the British Foreign Office, namely Serbs, Turks, Albanians, Greeks, Vlachs, Jews and Gypsies. In the eastern parts of the region, where a considerable part of Macedonian Slavs had pro-Bulgarian sentiments or felt themselves to be Bulgarians, that population welcomed the Bulgarian army as liberators. For the rest of the population and in particular for the Macedonian Slavs who identified as Serbs (or those who felt neither Serb nor Bulgarian), the brutality of the Bulgarian army, the irregulars Komitadji and the later civil administration had all the features of ethnic cleansing.

Role of paramilitaries

Besides the regular army, Bulgaria's paramilitary groups played an immense part in the fighting capabilities of Bulgaria, they were used as auxiliaries to provide knowledge of local conditions. They were known as komitadjis, these irregular troops also contributed strongly in brutalising the war. The notorious Internal Macedonian Revolutionary Organization (IMRO) served as a gendarmerie working hand in glove to ‘Bulgarianize’ the region. During the war the IMRO arose from a clandestine organization into an important factor of the Bulgarian nationalistic policy supporting the Bulgarization of the area.

Some paramilitary companies joined the Bulgarian Army forming the 11th Macedonian Infantry Division. Additionally, this division had guerrilla companies formed by IMRO-irregulars, that participated at the beginning of 1916 in several massacres of Macedonian Serbs in the areas of Azot, Skopska Crna Gora and Poreče, most notably Tasa Konević an Orthodox priest and Macedonian Serb Chetnik executed with 104 other Serb leaders from Poreče. Regular Bulgarian troops took control of the region while komitadjis were appointed mayors and prefects and took control of the whole police structure. Every major town was controlled by a komitadji leader whose power became absolute and legitimized through a new administrative system. IMRO member Naum Tomalevski, whose house was the headquarters of the Ilinden Uprising of 1903, was appointed mayor of Kruševo.
After 1917 the Bulgarian government started using paramilitary groups to gain control over the internal situation in both Pomoravlje and Macedonia. Aleksandar Protogerov who headed the Bulgarian occupation troops in Morava region crushed the uprising in the Toplica district with the help of IMRO irregulars. Bulgarians paramilitary groups were responsible for multiple instances of war crimes committing during the war in the parts of the Kingdom of Serbia under Bulgarian occupation.

War crimes 
Bulgarian Tsar Ferdinand declared on the eve of war: "the purpose of my life is the destruction of Serbia". Many Bulgarian troops were sidelined from front line duty to take part in the occupation of Serbia, past animosities led to brutality, the local population was left a choice between Bulgarization or being subject to violence, large scale deportations and the treatment of the residents of the occupation zones came close to genocidal actions.

The , a report covering alleged atrocities committed in Serbia, published after the war, stated that ‘anyone unwilling to submit him or herself to the occupiers and become Bulgarian was tortured, raped, interned, and killed in particularly gruesome manners, some of which recorded photographically'. Bulgarian units that occupied Serbian territories showed extreme brutality, systematically expelling the non-Bulgarian population in the regions they occupied, they arrested the population and set the rebel villages on fire.

In addition to the numerous cases of rape, Bulgarian forces encouraged the mixed marriage of Serbian women with Bulgarian men and espoused the view that children born to such marriages should be raised as Bulgarians. Middle-class Serbian functionaries were also suppressed: teachers, religious workers, functionaries, and intellectuals were executed by the Bulgarian soldiers who were following strict instructions to treat civilians the same way they treated soldiers. Additionally, there were regular bombardments of Serbian territories by the aviation and Bulgarian artillery which were operating on the Balkan front around the end of 1916. At the same time, there was a prohibition of Serbian culture; Bulgarians systematically looted Serbian monasteries and the toponymy of villages was changed to Bulgarian.

In addition to those sent to concentration camps, some 30,000 Serbs were sent to Austrian camps or used as forced labour. Factories were plundered of their machinery and a devastating typhus epidemic stalked the land. Thousands died in desperate uprisings, and in some cases, Bulgarian policy was so rigid that it even provoked mutinies among its own soldiers. The Bulgarian soldiers are depicted as simply living off the land without paying any redistribution and also robbing and hitting civilians, whereas the peasants had to work for the occupational authorities without getting any pay, this sometimes included working on defensive positions and carrying ammunition for the Bulgarians which violated the Hague conventions. In ex-Serb Macedonia, for the first time in history, gas chambers were used for the purpose of mass executions, exhaust pipes of trucks were attached to sealed sheds by Bulgarian soldiers where they herded the Serbs whom they wished to eliminate.

Counter-insurgency operations

Serbian Uprising 

From October 1916 to February 1917, a spontaneous Serbian uprising broke out in the Bulgarian-occupied territories of southern and eastern Serbia, notably in the valley of the Južna Morava, on Mount Kapaonik and in Kosovo. It followed attempts by the Bulgarian army to force draft Serbian men into the Bulgarian army and shoot those who resisted. The scheme was identical to that previously pursued by the Serbian army, which in August 1914 had attempted to conscript more than 60,000 people from Macedonia on the frontline defense of Serbia against the Austria-Hungarian attack.

Chetnik Lieutenant Kosta Milovanović-Pećanac was flown by the Serbian supreme command southwest of Niš for the purpose of locating and organising rebel action against enemy lines of communication, in preparation for a Serbian army offensive from the Salonika front. Most Serbian guerrilla leaders, including both Kosta Vojinović and Kosta Pećanac, set up their headquarters on Mount Kapaonik. By 3 March guerilla units made of local inhabitants had liberated Kuršumlija and Prokuplje as well as regions in the areas of Vlasotince and Sokobanja, coming 9km southwest of Niš. General Adolf Baron von Remen, governor of the Military General Governorate of Serbia, ordered Austro-Hungarian troops to cross into the Bulgarian zone in support while requesting Austrian Supreme Command to send assistance. Three armies of around 30,000 men tasked with crushing the uprising were sent to the region in the largest-ever anti-guerilla campaign. Austro-Hungarian, German and Bulgarian troops were brought from the Macedonian and Italian front, while in the Mitrovica district Albanian gendarmes were sent to track down rebel leaders. On 8 March, the Bulgarian army started their offensive while supported by Albanian detachments, artillery and air support. The Austro-Hungarians launched their attack on 12 March 1917.IMRO leader Aleksandar Protogerov was called to assist the Bulgarian army with the counter-insurgency operations, which were met with harsh reprisals throughout the country. On 10 March 1917 Protogerov issued an ultimatum to the chetniks to surrender within five days or face execution. They did not surrender, so Protogerov and his army attacked the civilian population and their villages. About 20,000 Serbs were killed in fighting, executions or reprisals. In the town of Surdulica alone about 2,500 Serbian men were executed, thousands of women and children were interned and others sent to prison. Thirty-six villages near Leskovac were completely depopulated. Families were left without a house or home. More than 80,000 were deported to Bulgaria, in Niš, almost the entire male population, some 4,000 men, was deported. One batch was sent by train to Pirot, the rest had to go on foot. 

On 24 March the Austro-Hungarian ordered its troops out of the Bulgarian zone, on 25 March the Bulgarian command officially ended its operation. On 28 March Protogerov declared an amnesty, promising internment instead of execution; none of the prominent Serb guerrilla and military leaders surrendered and continued instead guerilla actions on the occupiers throughout the rest of the war.

The insurrection of the Serb population is remembered as the only armed uprising of an occupied population in the whole of World War One.

Liberation and aftermath

On 15 September 1918 French and Serbian mountain troops successfully attacked hitherto impregnable Bulgarian positions at Dobro Pole. Greek and British forces joined in, the Bulgarians, deprived of German and Austrian support, quickly found themselves in full flight, pursued by the Army of the Orient. The Bulgarian Tsar and government decided to seek an armistice, capitulating on 30 September, the first of the Central Powers to do so. According to its terms, Bulgarian troops had to evacuate all occupied Greek and Serbian territories, including Macedonia.

The Serb army returned in 1918 to find a land devastated by war and exploitation; besides losing 210,000 men of its armed forces, Serbia suffered an additional 300,000 civilian casualties out of a 3.1 million population, material loses were incalculable

After the defeat of Bulgaria, and the return of Macedonia, the Slav population of the area was declared Serbian and Bulgarian cultural, religious, and educational institutions were closed down. Bulgaria was forced to give up all its conquered territory as a consequence of the Treaty of Neuilly imposed by the Allies, its army reduced to a force of 20,000 volunteers and stripped of much of its equipment; Four small regions (referred to by Bulgarians as the Western Outlands) were ceded to the Kingdom of the Serbs, Croats and Slovenes, its population also declared Serbian. Bulgaria would return in 1941, as an ally of Nazi Germany, to once more occupy the lands it believed were rightfully its own.

International response to Bulgarian war crimes
In 1899 and in 1907 for the first time, an International Peace Conferences was held at The Hague. The conference brought forward a codification of the customs and laws of war. Following the first world war, the Inter-Allied Commission a fifteen-member commission was created, ahead of the upcoming Paris Peace Conference of 1919, to report violations of the Hague Conventions, international laws, document war crimes and identify the perpetrators.

Inter-Allied Commission

The reports of the commission in Eastern Macedonia summarised the violations of the Hague Conventions: the massacre of the civilian population, torture, rape, internment, punitive economic expropriation, requisitions, and various taxes, plunder, forced labor, destruction, arson, and other actions aimed at "destroying the Serbian presence in the newly occupied territories".

Paris Peace Conference 
At the Peace Conference of 1919, the Commission on the Responsibility of the Authors of the War and on Enforcement of Penalties, a precursor of the United Nations War Crimes Commission, was created. The Commission organized war crimes "against the laws of war and humanity" into thirty-two specific classes including: "massacres, rapes, deportations and internments, tortures and deliberate starvation, forced labour and systematic terrorism".

Military governors
 Military Inspection Area of Morava
 1915 – 1917: Lt General Vasil Kutinchev
 1917: Major general Alexandar Protogerov
 1917 – 1918:  Lt General Stefan Nerezov
 Military Inspection Area of Macedonia
 1915 – 1916: Lt General Racho Petrov
 1916 – 1917: Lt General Pravoslav Tenev
 1915 – 1917: General Stefan Toshev

Notes

References

Citations

Sources
                    
  
  
     
 
 
     
    
 
    
   
      
  
     
 
 
   
   
 
     
 
 
     
     
 
     
     
     
    
    
    
  
 
  
     
     
      
                    *

Further reading 
 
 

 
Bulgaria–Serbia military relations
Bulgaria in World War I
Invasions of Serbia
Military occupations of Serbia
Military operations of World War I involving Bulgaria
Occupation of Serbia
Serbia in World War I